The Schlenk line (also vacuum gas manifold) is a commonly used chemistry apparatus developed by Wilhelm Schlenk. It consists of a dual manifold with several ports. One manifold is connected to a source of purified inert gas, while the other is connected to a vacuum pump. The inert-gas line is vented through an oil bubbler, while solvent vapors and gaseous reaction products are prevented from contaminating the vacuum pump by a liquid-nitrogen or dry-ice/acetone cold trap. Special stopcocks or Teflon taps allow vacuum or inert gas to be selected without the need for placing the sample on a separate line.

Schlenk lines are useful for safely and successfully manipulating moisture- and air-sensitive compounds. The vacuum is also often used to remove the last traces of solvent from a sample. Vacuum and gas manifolds often have many ports and lines, and with care, it is possible for several reactions or operations to be run simultaneously.

When the reagents are highly susceptible to oxidation, traces of oxygen may pose a problem. Then, for the removal of oxygen below the ppm level, the inert gas needs to be purified by passing it through a deoxygenation catalyst. This is usually a column of copper(I) or manganese(II) oxide, which reacts with oxygen traces present in the inert gas.

Techniques
The main techniques associated with the use of a Schlenk line include:
 counterflow additions, where air-stable reagents are added to the reaction vessel against a flow of inert gas;
 the use of syringes and rubber septa to transfer liquids and solutions;
 cannula transfer, where liquids or solutions of air-sensitive reagents are transferred between different vessels stoppered with septa using a long thin tube known as a cannula. Liquid flow is supported by vacuum or inert-gas pressure.

Glassware are usually connected by tightly fitting and greased ground glass joints. Round bends of glass tubing with ground glass joints may be used to adjust the orientation of various vessels. Glassware is necessarily purged of outside air by alternating application of vacuum and inert gas. The solvents and reagents that are used are also purged of air and water using various methods.

Filtration under inert conditions poses a special challenge that is usually tackled with specialized glassware. A Schlenk filter consists of sintered glass funnel fitted with joints and stopcocks. By fitting the pre-dried funnel and receiving flask to the reaction flask against a flow of nitrogen, carefully inverting the set-up, and turning on the vacuum appropriately, the filtration may be accomplished with minimal exposure to air.

Dangers
The main dangers associated with the use of a Schlenk line are the risks of an implosion or explosion. An implosion can occur due to the use of vacuum and flaws in the glass apparatus.

An explosion can occur due to the common use of liquid nitrogen in the cold trap, used to protect the vacuum pump from solvents. If a reasonable amount of air is allowed to enter the Schlenk line, liquid oxygen can condense into the cold trap as a pale blue liquid. An explosion may occur due to reaction of the liquid oxygen with any organic compounds also in the trap.

Gallery

See also
 Air-free technique gives a broad overview of methods including:
 Glovebox – used to manipulate air-sensitive (oxygen- or moisture-sensitive) chemicals.
 Schlenk flask – reaction vessel for handling air-sensitive compounds.
 Perkin triangle – used for the distillation of air-sensitive compounds.

References

Further reading
 
 
 
 
 "Handling Air-Sensitive Reagents" Sigma-Aldrich.

External links
 
 Preparation of a Manganese oxide column for inert gas purification from oxygen traces

Laboratory equipment
Laboratory glassware
Air-free techniques